"Metal Guru" is a song by the British rock band T. Rex, written by Marc Bolan. It was the band's fourth (and final) number one on the UK Singles Chart when it topped the chart for four weeks from May–June 1972. It was also included on the album The Slider in 1972.

Despite coming only ten months after the success of "Get It On", it failed to chart in the United States. The song reached No. 45 in Canada in July 1972.

Bolan himself described the song's apparent religious references as this:

In 2008, Freaky Trigger placed "Metal Guru" at number 37 in their list of "The Top 100 Songs of All Time".

Track listing
United Kingdom (EMI)
 "Metal Guru"
 "Thunderwing"
 "Lady"

Germany and Spain (Ariola)
 "Metal Guru" (2:25)
 "Lady" (2:12)

France (Columbia)
 "Metal Guru" (3:45)
 "Lady" (3:50)

Personnel
Marc Bolan – vocals, guitar
Mickey Finn – percussion, vocals
Steve Currie – bass
Bill Legend – drums
Howard Kaylan, Mark Volman – backing vocals
Tony Visconti – string arrangements
Produced by Tony Visconti

Chart performance

Year-end charts

Cover versions
In 2005, rock band Rooney covered the song for the Herbie: Fully Loaded soundtrack.
"Metal Guru" was covered and recorded by Serbian new wave band Električni Orgazam as a B-side for the band's fourth single "Locomotion" from their cover album Les Chansones Populaires, released in 1983. Srđan Gojković Gile provided the lead vocals for the track. There are no recorded live versions of the song.
The Smiths based their song "Panic" on "Metal Guru".
American indie rock band Louis XIV were heavily influenced by this song when writing "A Letter to Dominique" from The Best Little Secrets Are Kept.

See also
List of number-one hits of 1972 (Germany)
List of number-one singles of 1972 (Ireland)
List of UK Singles Chart number ones of the 1970s

References

1972 singles
1972 songs
Irish Singles Chart number-one singles
Number-one singles in Germany
Song recordings produced by Tony Visconti
Songs written by Marc Bolan
T. Rex (band) songs
UK Singles Chart number-one singles